The Šamac oil field is an oil field located in Šamac . It was discovered in 2004 and developed by Energopetrol (EP). If the information regarding this oil field is correct then it is the largest onshore oil field in Europe.

References

Oil fields in Bosnia and Herzegovina